Steve French may refer to:

 Steve French (politician) (born 1962), member of the Alabama Senate
 Steve French (singer) (1959–2016), American baritone with the Kingdom Heirs
 Steve French (cougar), a cougar in a 2004 episode of the Canadian comedy mockumentary Trailer Park Boys
 Steve French, host of The Morning Buzz on WNIR
 Steven French, American voice actor